The Basilica of Our Lady of the Rosary, also known as Basilica of Caieiras, is a Roman Catholic basilica affiliated to the Heralds of the Gospel, in Caieiras, in the State of São Paulo, the south of Brazil.

History
The Basilica of Our Lady of the Rosary began in October 2006, inspired by the Gothic style of the great medieval European cathedrals such as Notre-Dame de Paris and Saint Chapelle in the same city.

The solemn dedication was celebrated on February 24, 2008, presided over by Cardinal Franc Rodé, CM, then prefect of the Congregation for Institutes of Consecrated Life and Societies of Apostolic Life.

On October 18, 2009, it rose to the status of a parish church, responding to requests from the faithful of the region.

Finally, on April 21, 2012, Pope Benedict XVI declared it a minor basilica.

See also
Roman Catholicism in Brazil
Our Lady of the Rosary
Basilica Our Lady of the Rosary

References

Basilica churches in Brazil
Heralds of the Gospel
Roman Catholic churches completed in 2008
Roman Catholic churches in São Paulo (state)